Kangro may refer to:
Kangro, a village in Tibet
Kangro (surname), Estonian surname

See also
Kangru (disambiguation)